Roddick is a surname. Notable people with the surname include:

Surname
Andy Roddick (born 1982), American tennis player
Anita Roddick (1942–2007), British entrepreneur and environmentalist
Sam Roddick (born 1971), British businesswoman, daughter of Anita
Thomas George Roddick (1846–1923), Canadian surgeon, medical administrator, and politician

See also
Federer–Roddick rivalry, a rivalry between two professional tennis players, Roger Federer of Switzerland and Andy Roddick of the United States
Roddick Gates, also Roddick Memorial Gates, are monumental gates in Montreal that serve as the main entrance to the McGill University campus